The 2018 KNSB Dutch Single Distance Championships were held at the Thialf skating rink in Heerenveen from Friday 27 October 2017 to Sunday 29 October 2017. Although the tournament was held in 2017 it was the 2018 edition as it was part of the 2017–2018 speed skating season.

Schedule

Medalists

Men

Women

Source:

References

External links
 KNSB

Dutch Single Distance Championships
Single Distance Championships
2018 Single Distance
KNSB Dutch Single Distance Championships, 2018